I Am Bolt is a 2016 British biographical documentary sports film co-directed by Benjamin Turner and Gabe Turner and produced by Leo Pearlman. It is based on the life of Jamaican sprinter and three times Olympic gold medalist and World Record holder for 100m, 200m, 4×100m relay, Usain Bolt, the fastest man in recorded human history.

The film describes Bolt's journey in winning nine gold medals and the incidents surrounding the Olympic titles. The film was released on 28 November 2016 in United Kingdom and then worldwide. The film received mostly positive reviews from critics.

Cast 
 Usain Bolt himself
 Pelé himself
 Neymar himself
 Serena Williams herself
 Asafa Powell himself
 Sebastian himself
 Ziggy Marley himself
 Nas with voice
 Glen Mills himself
 Ricky Simms himself
 Chronixx himself
 Yohan Blake himself
 Maurice Greene himself
 Wellesley and Jennifer Bolt – his parents themselves
 Dwayne Jarrett – Bolt's school coach himself
 Nugent Walker – Bolt's manager himself
 Dwayne Barnett himself

Reception

Critical response
I Am Bolt received positive reviews. On review aggregator Rotten Tomatoes, the film has an approval rating of 83% based on 242 reviews, with an average rating of 7/10. The site's critical consensus reads, "
Bolt's golden era may be too recent and the sponsors too dominant for any real warts to be included, but his charm and sheer physical wonder make this a compelling watch regardless."

Justin Lowe of The Hollywood Reporter reacted positively, saying: "Athletic achievements don’t get much more unbeatable than the records held by Jamaican runner Usain Bolt, who’s won nine consecutive Olympic gold medals and even more World Championship awards. Considered the fastest sprinter who’s ever logged track time, Bolt is a hero to millions and admired on a level comparable to global sports legends like Muhammad Ali and Pele."

Xan Brooks of The Guardian gave it 2/5, stating "Fans of Usain Bolt will find much to relish in this gushing homage to the nine-time Olympic gold medallist, which chases its idol from his 2015 slump, via scenes of downtime in Jamaica to the podium in Rio.

References

External links 
 

Sports films based on actual events
Running films
Biographical films about sportspeople
Documentary films about sportspeople
2010s biographical films
2016 films
Pelé
Cultural depictions of track and field athletes
Cultural depictions of Jamaican men
2010s English-language films